Wood End Park Academy is a primary school with academy status in Hayes, Hillingdon. It is part of the Park Federation Academy Trust, along with Cranford Park Academy.

History
Wood End Park Junior Mixed and Infants school was opened in 1930. During World War II, dogfights from the Battle of Britain could be seen from the school's playing fields.

Ethnic diversity
Wood End Park Academy serves a multicultural community, with the proportion of pupils coming from minority ethnic backgrounds being far higher than average. Less than a third are White British, with the largest ethnic groups being Somali, Black African and Asian Indian.

References

Primary schools in the London Borough of Hillingdon
Academies in the London Borough of Hillingdon